Amy Nnenna Okonkwo (born 26 August 1996) is a Nigerian-American basketball player for Saint-Amand Hainaut Basket in the  Ligue Féminine de Basketball and the Nigerian National Team.

Nigerian National team career 
Amy represented Nigeria at the 2020 Summer Olympics in Tokyo where she averaged 2.7 point and 1 rebound. She also participated in the 2021 Afrobasket where she won gold with the team and averaged 9.4 points, 4.2 rebounds and 0.4 assists.

References

1990 births
Living people
Citizens of Nigeria through descent
Nigerian women's basketball players
Shooting guards
Basketball players at the 2020 Summer Olympics
Olympic basketball players of Nigeria
Nigerian expatriate basketball people in Spain
Nigerian expatriate basketball people in France
American women's basketball players
Southern Polytechnic State University
African-American basketball players
Nigerian people of African-American descent
American emigrants to Nigeria
American sportspeople of Nigerian descent
21st-century African-American sportspeople
African-American sportswomen
American expatriate basketball people in Spain